Ou Mengjue (1906–1992) was a People's Republic of China politician. She was born in Nanhai, Guangdong Province. She was CPPCC Committee Chairwoman of her home province. She was a delegate to the 1st National People's Congress and 3rd National People's Congress.

References

1906 births
1992 deaths
20th-century Chinese women politicians
All-China Women's Federation people
Chinese Communist Party politicians from Guangdong
Delegates to the 5th National Congress of the Chinese Communist Party
Delegates to the 1st National People's Congress
Delegates to the 3rd National People's Congress
Members of the Central Advisory Commission
People's Republic of China politicians from Guangdong
Political office-holders in Guangdong
Politicians from Foshan